The 2016–17 season is the 57th season in SD Huesca ’s history.

Squad

Competitions

Overall

Liga

League table

Copa del Rey

References

SD Huesca seasons
Huesca